Tatiana Moiseeva (Russian Татья́на Ю́рьевна Моисе́ева; *September 9 1981) is a former Russian biathlete.

Career 
Moiseeva made her Biathlon World Cup debut in a sprint race in Oslo Holmenkollen during the 2002-03 Biathlon World Cup season. She was in and out of the A-Team for the next few years until she became a permanent member of the team during the 2006-07 Biathlon World Cup season. However, this mostly had to do with several established names on the Russian team having to sit out due to injuries, pregnancies or doping bans.

Moiseeva's best ever results came in the sprint and pursuit in Pokljuka, Slovenia during the 2006-07 Biathlon World Cup season, and again, in the individual in Kontiolahti, Finland the following season. Her best ever finish in the overall World Cup came during these same seasons when she finished 20th both years.

In March 2008, Moiseeva was suspected of having used doping at the Biathlon World Championships 2008 in Östersund, Sweden. However, she got acquitted by the IBU as she only took her substance in liquid form and that was not considered a doping offense at that point in time.

World Championships

*During Olympic seasons competitions are only held for those events not included in the Olympic program.
**Team was removed as an event in 1998, and pursuit was added in 1997 with mass start being added in 1999 and the mixed relay in 2005.

References

External links
 

1981 births
People from Khanty-Mansiysk
Russian female biathletes
Living people
Sportspeople from Khanty-Mansi Autonomous Okrug